Knife making is the process of manufacturing a knife by any one or a combination of processes: stock removal, forging to shape, welded lamination or investment cast.  Typical metals used come from the carbon steel, tool, or stainless steel families. Primitive knives have been made from bronze, copper, brass, iron, obsidian, and flint.

Materials for blades

Different steels are suited to different applications. There is a trade off between hardness, toughness, edge retention, corrosion resistance, and achievable sharpness. Some examples of blade material and their relative trade offs:

The newest powder metallurgy steels can be made very hard, but can quickly wear out abrasives and tooling.
A blade made from low carbon or mild steel would be inexpensive to produce and of poor quality.  A low carbon blade would be very hard to break, but would bend easily and be too soft to hold an edge. High carbon (or high alloy, in some listings) can take a much higher hardness but must be tempered carefully after heat treatment to avoid brittleness.

Unusual non-metallic materials may also be used; manufacturing techniques are quite different from metal:

The natural volcanic glass obsidian can achieve a nearly molecular edge (high achievable sharpness) and only requires Stone Age technology to work, but is so brittle that it cannot maintain that sharpness for very long. Also the entire blade is very easy to break by accident. Obsidian is used to make extremely sharp surgical scalpels.
Ceramic knives hold their edge for a long time, but are brittle.

Blade making process

Initial forging

The initial shaping of a knife is done through forging or blanking. Steel can be folded either to form decorative pattern welded steel or to refine raw steel, or as the Japanese call it, tamahagane. Grain size is kept at a minimum as grain growth can happen quite easily if the blade material is overheated.

In a mass production environment, or in a well equipped private shop, the blanking process is used to make "blade blanks." This can be achieved by a number of different methods, depending upon the thickness of the material and the alloy content of steel to be cut. Thinner cross section, lower alloy blanks can be stamped from sheet material. Materials that are more difficult to work with, or jobs that require higher production volume, can be accomplished with water jet cutters, lasers or electron beam cutting. These two lend themselves towards larger custom shops.  Some custom knife makers cut their blanks from steel using a metal-cutting bandsaw.

Knife makers will sometimes contract out to a shop with the above capabilities to do blanking. For lower production makers, or lower budgets, other methods must suffice. Knife makers may use many different methods to profile a blank. These can include hacksaws, files, belt grinders, wheel grinders, oxy-acetylene torches, CNC mills, or any number of other methods depending on budget.

Grinding

If no power equipment is available, this can be done with files if the piece of steel has not yet been hardened. Grinding wheels, or small belt sanders are usually what a beginner uses. Well equipped makers usually use a large industrial belt grinder, or a belt grinder made specifically for knife making. Pre-polish grinding on a heat treated blade can be done if the blade is kept cool, to preserve the temper of the steel. Some knife makers will use a coolant mist on the grinder to achieve this.

Heat treatment

Methods of heat treatment: atmosphere furnace, molten salt, vacuum furnace, coal (coke) forge, oxy/acetylene torch. Quenching after heat treatment differs according to type of metal and personal preferences. Quenching can be done with oil, animal tallow, water, air, or brine.

Blade finishes
The finish quality of the blade is determined by the Grit of the finishing grind.  These can range from a low-shine 280-320 grit finish to a mirror-shine. The high polish shine can be accomplished by buffing with chrome oxide (ex. white chrome, green chrome), hand rubbing with extremely fine wet-or-dry abrasive paper, or with a Japanese water-stone, which has an approximate grit of 10,000-12,000.  Most high quality manufactured knives have about an 800 grit finish.

Handle making process
Handle making can be done in several different ways depending on the tang of the knife. Full tang knives usually have handle scales either pinned, riveted, or screwed on to the tang itself while knives without a full tang may be inserted into a solid handle and then attached in one of the previously stated methods. Handle materials can range from natural materials including wood or elk horn to man-made materials like brass, plastic, polymer or micarta. A knife makers grinder may have additional attachments for making knife handles, such as small diameter contact wheels.

References

Knives
Metalworking